Ovett is a census-designated place and unincorporated community in southeastern Jones County, Mississippi. Ovett is part of the Laurel Micropolitan Statistical Area.

History
It was first established as a sawmill town in the early 20th century. Ovett is located on the former Gulf, Mobile and Ohio Railroad and was once home to six general stores, a blacksmith, pharmacy, three lumber companies, and two grocery stores.

It was first named as a CDP in the 2020 Census which listed a population of 183.

Camp Sister Spirit, a feminist retreat, is located in Ovett.

Geography
Ovett is located just west of the De Soto National Forest and Highway 15. The community has a post office with the ZIP code 39464.

Demographics

2020 census

Note: the US Census treats Hispanic/Latino as an ethnic category. This table excludes Latinos from the racial categories and assigns them to a separate category. Hispanics/Latinos can be of any race.

References

External links

Unincorporated communities in Jones County, Mississippi
Unincorporated communities in Mississippi
Census-designated places in Jones County, Mississippi
Laurel micropolitan area